Love is an unincorporated community in Cass County, Texas, United States.

The Love Chapel Missionary Baptist Church and Cemetery, established in 1895, is located in the hamlet.

References

Unincorporated communities in Cass County, Texas
Unincorporated communities in Texas